The Humphrey House in Reno, Nevada, located at 467 Ralston St., is a historic house built in 1906.  Designed by Reno architect Fred Schadler, it is significant architecturally and for association with Nevada governors Tasker Oddie and Emmet Boyle, who were guests there.  It was listed on the National Register of Historic Places in 1983.

Its NRHP nomination identifies it as "a superlative residential example of the Mission
Revival style and one that is unique to Reno."  It was built for the Frank E. Humphrey family and owned by the family into the 1960s.

See also
20th Century Club (Reno, Nevada), also Schadler-designed and NRHP-listed

References 

Houses completed in 1906
Houses on the National Register of Historic Places in Nevada
Mission Revival architecture in Nevada
National Register of Historic Places in Reno, Nevada
Houses in Reno, Nevada
1906 establishments in Nevada